Bellevue School District No. 405 (BSD) is a public school district in King County, headquartered in Bellevue. As of October 1, 2016, the district has an enrollment of 19,974 students.

The Bellevue School District includes 28 schools: 15 elementary schools, 1 Spanish immersion elementary school, 1 Chinese immersion elementary school, 5 regular middle schools, 4 regular high schools, and two district-wide choice schools (grades 6-12).  The district has a staff of about 2,900 employees, including about 1,500 teachers.

In 2013, Newsweek magazine named Bellevue, Interlake, International, Newport and Sammamish to its list of "America's Best High Schools".    In 2013, The Washington Post placed Bellevue, Interlake, International, Newport and Sammamish on its list of "America's Most Challenging High Schools".   In 2013, U.S. News & World Report ranked Bellevue, Interlake, International and Newport among its "Best High Schools".

Boundary
It includes the majority of Bellevue. Additionally it includes Beaux Arts Village, Clyde Hill, Hunts Point, Medina, and Yarrow Point. It also has a portion of Redmond and a very small portion of Kirkland.

Demographics
As of October 2020, there were 19,545 students enrolled in the district. 100 languages are spoken in the district, with 40.2% of students speaking a first language other than English. 15.7% of students receive ELL (English Language Learner) Services. 17.2% of students qualify for free or reduced lunch. The racial demographics of the district are: 3.1% Black/African American, 43.2% Asian, 12.7% Hispanic, 9.3% Multi-Ethnic, 0.1% Native American/American Indian/Alaska Native, 0.3% Native Hawaiian/Pacific Islander, and 31.3% White. 

By February 2015 the district experienced an influx of highly educated immigrant families from East Asia and South Asia who selected the district due to its reputation for strong academics and testimonials from foreign sources. The district's number of Indian language-speaking students was 185 in 2004. As of 2015 the district had about 1,600 students who spoke Mandarin Chinese, Cantonese, and/or Taiwanese Min-Nan; and the district also had over 800 speakers of Indian languages. The speakers of Chinese had increased by 91% in a ten-year span beginning around 2004, and speakers of Indian languages had increased around 400% during the same period.

Schools
Students attend elementary (primary) school from kindergarten to fifth grade, middle school from sixth to eighth grade, and high school from ninth to twelfth grade. Each of the school, except Choice schools, have a defined geographic attendance area. Students are assigned to a school based on the attendance area in which they reside. With three exceptions, these schools are located in the city of Bellevue. Clyde Hill Elementary and Chinook Middle School are located in the city of Clyde Hill.

High schools (Grades 9-12)
Bellevue High School
Interlake High School 
Newport High School 
Sammamish High School

Middle schools (Grades 6- 8)
Chinook Middle School 
Highland Middle School 
Odle Middle School 
Tillicum Middle School 
Tyee Middle School

Elementary schools (Grades Pre-K to 5th grade)
Ardmore Elementary School
Bennett Elementary School
Cherry Crest Elementary School
Clyde Hill Elementary School
Eastgate Elementary School
Enatai Elementary School
Lake Hills Elementary School
Medina Elementary School
Newport Heights Elementary School
Phantom Lake Elementary School
Sherwood Forest Elementary School
Somerset Elementary School
Spiritridge Elementary School
Stevenson Elementary School
Woodridge Elementary School
Wilburton Elementary

Choice schools
Bellevue Big Picture School (6-12)
International School (6-12)
Puesta del Sol Elementary School (K-5 Spanish immersion)
Jing Mei Elementary School (K-5 Chinese immersion)
Bellevue Digital Discovery (K-12 All Online)

Former schools
Over the years, the district closed several schools. In many cases, declining enrollment after the baby boomers graduated led to closure. The district leased some schools to private schools or non-profit organizations. Some properties were transferred to other local governments.
 Ashwood Elementary School is the Bellevue Regional Library and two sports fields.
 Ivanhoe Elementary School is a performing arts center and public park. Ivanhoe Elementary School opened in 1962 and closed in 1981.
Kelsey Creek Home School Center (1-12) closed in June 2012.
 Lake Heights Elementary School became a YMCA location. In 2008, it traded sites with Newport Heights Elementary.
 Ringdall Junior High School was Eastside Catholic School and is now used as a temporary location for schools whose regular buildings are under construction. Currently, Ringdall is the temporary home of Cougar Mountain Middle School of the Issaquah School District.
 Robinswood Middle School and Robinswood High School were closed and replaced by The Big Picture School.
 Surrey Downs School is now a King County District Court location and sports fields.
 Three Points Elementary School, located in Medina, is now an elementary school for Bellevue Christian Schools.
 Union S High School is now Bellevue Downtown Park. It was once known as Overlake High School.
 Wilburton School is now District offices and a City park.

2008 strike
On June 10, 2008, Bellevue teachers voted almost unanimously to go on strike if a new contract could not be reached by the end of the summer. On the evening of September 1, the day before classes would have started, the Bellevue Education Association (BEA) announced the beginning of the strike. On September 14, BEA members agreed to the tentative agreement that school was to begin on September 15. The dispute between the BEA and BSD had three main issues: compensation; benefits; and use of the Curriculum Web, a strictly enforced curriculum for all teachers to follow.

Honors

President Barack Obama visited Medina Elementary School on February 17, 2012. He spent 10 minutes at the school, greeting about 450 students with hand shakes and high fives.

References

External links

Bellevue School District Report Card
Newsweek listing of top public high schools
Bellevue Schools Timeline: 1883–Present, from the Eastside Heritage Center

 
Education in King County, Washington
School districts in Washington (state)
School districts established in 1942
1942 establishments in Washington (state)